James Browne (born 15 October 1975) is an Irish Fianna Fáil politician who has served as a Minister of State at the Department of Justice since September 2020. He has been a Teachta Dála (TD) for the Wexford constituency since 2016.

Browne comes from a family of Fianna Fáil politicians. He is the only son of former TD John Browne. His great uncle, Seán Browne, was also a TD. He studied hotel management and catering in Dublin IT before studying law in Waterford IT, University College Cork and King's Inns, where he qualified as a barrister.

He was member of Enniscorthy Town Council from 2009 to 2014. He was a member of Wexford County Council from 2014 to 2016. At the 2016 general election, Browne was selected to replace his father John as a Fianna Fáil candidate for Wexford, as he was retiring from politics. Browne was elected as a TD in this election, receiving 13.7% of the vote; however his running-mates Malcolm Byrne and Aoife Byrne were not elected.

Browne opposed the repeal of the 8th amendment in 2018, which removed the ban on abortion in Ireland.

On 2 September 2020, Browne was appointed by the coalition government led by Micheál Martin as a Minister of State at the Department of Justice with responsibility for law reform. He was assigned additional responsibility for civil justice and immigration from April to October 2021 during the maternity leave of Helen McEntee.

Browne is married and has two children.

References

External links
James Browne's page on the Fianna Fáil website

1975 births
Living people
Fianna Fáil TDs
Local councillors in County Wexford
Members of the 32nd Dáil
Members of the 33rd Dáil
Alumni of King's Inns
Ministers of State of the 33rd Dáil